Silver Oak College of Engineering and Technology (SOCET ), is an engineering college located in Ahmedabad, Gujarat, India.

Programs
The institute runs several degree programs, including:
 Civil engineering 
 Computer engineering
 Electrical engineering
 Information technology
 Aeronautical engineering
 Mechanical engineering
 Chemical engineering

Events and activities 
There are many activities going on in the campus almost every week:
 Blood donation camps
 Parents teacher meeting
 Cultural festival
 Technical festival
 Pasti ki Masti – happy to help
 Other sports activities

Clubs 
 Indian Rosewood – mechanical engineering
 Chemical Club – chemical engineering
 Peepal Club – Macintosh community
 White Oak Club – design and development students
 BlackCherry Club – virtual reality team
 Banyan Club – Linux community
 Sandalwood Club – electronics and communications students

References

Universities and colleges in Ahmedabad
Engineering colleges in Gujarat